John Taylor (born 10 July 1926) was an English amateur footballer who played as an inside forward.

Career
Born in Durham, Taylor played for Bishop Auckland, Leytonstone, Crystal Palace and Dartford.

References

1926 births
Date of death missing
English footballers
Bishop Auckland F.C. players
Leytonstone F.C. players
Crystal Palace F.C. players
Dartford F.C. players
English Football League players
Association football inside forwards